Girl Meets World is an American comedy television series created by Michael Jacobs and April Kelly that premiered on Disney Channel on June 27, 2014. The series ran for three seasons, consisting of 72 episodes, and concluded on January 20, 2017. The series is a spinoff of Boy Meets World and stars Rowan Blanchard, Ben Savage, Sabrina Carpenter, Peyton Meyer, August Maturo, Danielle Fishel, and Corey Fogelmanis.

The series centers around the life of Riley and her friends and family, particularly their school life, in which Cory is their history teacher. Riley shares a strong relationship with her best friend Maya Hart, who assists her in learning to cope with social and personal issues of adolescence. Several Boy Meets World cast members reprise their roles in the series.

Series overview

Episodes

Season 1 (2014–15) 
 While Corey Fogelmanis becomes listed as a main cast member later in the season, he is a guest star for thirteen episodes.

Special (2015) 
 This episode aired between the first and second season as part of Disney Channel's "What the What" special event and is not classified as an episode from either season despite being filmed during season two.

Season 2 (2015–16)

Season 3 (2016–17)

See also 
 List of Girl Meets World characters

References 

Lists of American children's television series episodes
Lists of American comedy television series episodes
Lists of Disney Channel television series episodes